Iceberg B-15 was the largest recorded iceberg by area. Calved from the Ross Ice Shelf of Antarctica in March 2000, Iceberg B-15 broke up into smaller icebergs, the largest of which was named Iceberg B-15-A. In 2003, B-15A drifted away from Ross Island into the Ross Sea and headed north, eventually breaking up into several smaller icebergs in October 2005. In 2018, a large piece of the original iceberg was steadily moving northward, located between the Falkland Islands and South Georgia Island. As of December 2022, the U.S. National Ice Center (USNIC) still lists one extant piece of B-15 that meets the minimum threshold for tracking. This iceberg, B-15ab, measures ; it is currently grounded off the coast of Antarctica in the western sector of the Amery region.

History

In the last weeks of March 2000, Iceberg B-15 calved from the Ross Ice Shelf near Roosevelt Island, Antarctica. The calving occurred along pre-existing cracks in the ice shelf. Scientists believe that the enormous piece of ice broke away as part of a long-term natural cycle, which occurs every fifty to one hundred years. In 2000, 2002, and 2003, Iceberg B-15 broke up into several pieces, the largest of which, B-15A, covered  of the sea surface.

In November 2003, after the separation from B-15J, B-15A drifted away from Ross Island on the open waters of the Ross Sea. In December 2003, a small knife-shaped iceberg, B-15K (about 300 km2), detached itself from the main body of B-15A and started drifting northward. By January 2005, prevailing currents caused B-15A to drift toward the Drygalski Ice Tongue, a  extension of the land-based David Glacier, which flows through the coastal mountains of Victoria Land. A few kilometres from the ice tongue, the iceberg became stranded on a shallow seamount before resuming its northward course. On 10 April 2005, B-15A collided with the ice tongue, breaking off the tip of the ice tongue; the iceberg seemed unaffected by the collision.

Iceberg B-15A continued to drift along the coast leaving McMurdo Sound. On 27–28 October 2005, the iceberg ran aground off Cape Adare in Victoria Land and broke into several smaller pieces, generating seismic signals that were detected as far away as the Amundsen-Scott South Pole Station the largest of which was still named B-15A (now measuring approximately ). Three additional pieces were named B-15P, B-15M, and B-15N. Iceberg B-15A then moved farther up north and broke up into more pieces. These were spotted by air force fisheries patrol on 3 November 2006.

As of 2018, four pieces remain that are large enough to be tracked by the National Ice Center (at least ). One piece, B-15Z, measures . As it continues its move northward, the speed of melt increases. Most icebergs do not last long this far north.

By 2020, only two pieces remained large enough to track. B-15aa – a direct remnant of B-15z – was drifting to the east of the island of South Georgia, in the south Atlantic Ocean. B-15ab remained among sea ice along the coast of Antarctica south of Africa. In 2021, B-15ab became the last fragment to remain on the US National Ice Center list of tracked icebergs, still grounded off the coast of Antarctica.

Effects on Antarctic ecology

On 29 January 2001, researchers from the University of Chicago and the University of Wisconsin installed weather and Global Positioning System instruments on Iceberg B-15A. It was the first time an iceberg had been monitored in this way. The data gathered led to an unprecedented understanding of how giant icebergs make their way through the waters of Antarctica and beyond.

Iceberg B-15A collided  with Drygalski Ice Tongue on 10 April 2005, breaking off an  section of the ice tongue. Antarctic maps needed to be redrawn.

B-15A prevented ocean currents and winds from assisting in the 2004–2005 summer break-up of the sea ice in McMurdo Sound, and was an obstacle to the annual resupply ships to three research stations. The floe was expected to cause a catastrophic decline in the population of Adélie penguins, as it added considerable distances which parent penguins must travel back from the sea to their chicks. Weddell seals and skuas are also inhabitants of McMurdo Sound and their populations may have been affected as well.

On 21 October 2005 a large storm in the Gulf of Alaska generated a trans-Pacific ocean swell that may have contributed to breaking B15-A into many pieces on 27 October 2005. The swell travelled  from Alaska to Antarctica over six days. Scientists are studying this event as an example of how weather in one area can have effects in other parts of the world, and with concern over the effects on global warming.

A more detailed study in 2010, however, shows that the iceberg breakup was principally caused by repeated grounding with near-coastal bathymetry near Cape Adare, Victoria Land.

Satellite images

See also

Encounters at the End of the World, a Werner Herzog documentary which contains some footage of B-15

References

Notes

Citations

Further reading

External links

 ESA: Situation Around Balleby Islands; Icebergs B-15A, B-15N, C-19A 
 ESA: Envisat Shows Behemoth B-15A Iceberg Breaking Up 
 NASA: Antarctic Iceberg Gets Stuck 
 B-15A Iceberg Blocks McMurdo Sound (NASA Earth Observatory), 
 Tracking the World's largest Iceberg B 15 

Geography of Antarctica
B-15